St Andrew, also known as Andrew, was a 42-gun great ship of the Royal Navy (subsequently second rate), built by Andrew Burrell at Deptford and launched in 1622.

The ship first saw action as part of the expeditionary force to Cádiz in 1625, and was taken over by Parliament when the First English Civil War began in August 1642. Known as Andrew until the 1660 Stuart Restoration, most of her service during the Wars of the Three Kingdoms was spent supporting coastal operations. These included an attack on Pendennis Castle, one of the last Royalist holdouts in Cornwall; in a letter dated 30 June 1646, Sir William Batten, its Parliamentarian captain, wrote to his superior that Sir, I believe the castle of Pendennis will not be long out of our hands; a dogger boat with four guns I have taken, whereof one Kedgwin of Penzant was captain, a notable active knave against the Parliament, and had the King's commission; and now would fain be a merchant man, and was balasted with salt and had divers letters in her for Pendennis castle...
 
After taking part in the First Anglo-Dutch War and being severely damaged during the Second, she was refitted and her armament upgraded to 66 guns. On 3 September 1666, she was driven ashore by a storm near Rye, East Sussex; it was decided repairs would be too expensive and two months later she was stripped of her fittings and broken up.

Notes

References

Lavery, Brian (2003) The Ship of the Line - Volume 1: The development of the battlefleet 1650-1850. Conway Maritime Press. .

External links
 

Ships of the line of the Royal Navy
Ships built in Deptford
Shipwrecks
1620s ships
17th-century maritime incidents
Maritime incidents in 1666
Ships of the English navy